Two Hardy-class destroyers served with the Royal Navy.   and  were both built by Doxford, ordered on 3 November 1893. They were fitted with 8 Yarrow boilers. They displaced 260 tons, were 196 feet long and were armed with one twelve pounder quick-firing gun mounted forward and five 6-pounder guns, mounted on the broadside and aft, and two torpedo tubes on a revolving mount. They carried 53 officers and men, and served in home waters (although Hardy was briefly in the Mediterranean in 1900) before being sold off in 1911 and 1912 respectively.

As was typical for torpedo craft at the time, the Admiralty left detailed design to the builders, laying down only broad requirements.

See also
A-class destroyer (1913)

Bibliography

References

Destroyer classes
 
Ship classes of the Royal Navy